Odiniidae  is a small family of flies. There are only 58 described species but there are representatives in all the major biogeographic realms.

Life histories are known for only few species of Odinia, and no biological information is available for the majority of species in the family. Known odiniid larvae live in the tunnels of wood-boring larvae of Coleoptera, Lepidoptera, and other Diptera and function as scavengers or predators of the host larvae. One species, Turanodinia coccidarum Stackelberg, has been reared from the egg masses of Pseudococcus comstocki Kuwana, a mealybug.

Family description

See  which as well as text has excellent illustrations of Odinia viz .

Taxonomy

 Subfamily Odiniinae
Afrodinia Cogan, 1975
Neoalticomerus Hendel, 1903
Odinia Robineau-Desvoidy, 1830
Turanodinia Stackelberg, 1944
 Subfamily Traginopinae
Coganodinia Gaimari & Mathis, 2008
Helgreelia Gaimari, 2007
Lopesiodinia Prado, 1973
Neoschildomyia Gaimari, 2007
Neotraginops Prado, 1973
Paratraginops Hendel, 1917
Pradomyia Gaimari, 2007
Schildomyia Malloch, 1926
Shewellia Hennig, 1969
Traginops Coquillett, 1900

Identification
Cogan, B.H.,1975 New Taxa in Two Families Previously Unrecorded from the Ethiopian Region(Diptera, Odiniidae and Diastatidae). Ann. Natal Mus. 22(2):471-488. Key to Afrotropic genera and species.
Prado, A. P., 1973 Contribuicão ao Conhecimento da Familia Odiniidae (Diptera, Acalyptratae). Studia Entomologica, Petrópolis, v. 16, n. 1-4, p. 481-510. Keys world genera.
Collin, J.E. (1952), On the European species of the genus Odinia R.-D. (Diptera: Odiniidae). Proceedings of the Royal entomological Society of London (B) 21: 110-116.

Other literature
Papp, L., 1978 71. család: Odiniidae - Taplólegyek.In: Dély-Draskovits Á. & Papp L., Taplólegyek - Gabonalegyek. Odiniidae - Chloropidae. Fauna Hung., 133, 202 pp. Akadémiai Kiadó, Budapest. (In Hungarian).

Species lists
 Palaearctic
Nearctic
 Japan
 Australasian/Oceanian
British

External links
Images from Diptera.info

Sources

 
Brachycera families
Articles containing video clips